Oklahoma State University Institute of Technology (OSUIT) is a public institute of technology in Okmulgee, Oklahoma.  It is part of the Oklahoma State University System.  OSUIT has thirty-seven programs of study which include thirty-one programs of study towards an Associate in Applied Science degree, four programs towards an Associate in Science transfer degree, and three programs towards Bachelor of Technology degrees.

The school, historically known by the informal name Okmulgee Tech, has changed its official name several times, most recently in 2008 when it was changed to OSU Institute of Technology, to distinguish it from the rest of the OSU system as a school for applied technology.

History
Before Oklahoma statehood, the site of the school had served as a Creek Nation orphanage from 1892 to 1906.  In 1943 the United States Army acquired the site to serve under the jurisdiction of Camp Gruber as Glennan General Hospital, initially intended for U.S. troops but subsequently designated as a facility for treating prisoners of war (mainly Germans) captured in North Africa and elsewhere.  After World War II ended, Oklahoma A&M acquired the camp and converted it into a branch campus, whose initial emphasis was vocational training for veterans, both male and female.  The school has seen several name changes and received its current name in 2008.

Leadership

Institution names
Names of the institution have included:

Industry sponsors
Plains All American Pipeline
Caterpillar Inc.
 Ford Motor Company
 General Motors
 Komatsu
 Toyota Motor Company
 Western Equipment Dealers Association
 Pro-Tech (general automotive which includes certifications from Subaru
 MCAP (Mopar, Fiat-Chrysler)
 Phillips 66
 Weyerhaeuser
 Gas Processors Association

References

Davis, Larry D. (1991) OSU at Okmulgee: Centennial Histories Series, Oklahoma State University.

External links 
 Official website

Oklahoma State University
OK Cooperative Alliance
Education in Okmulgee County, Oklahoma
Buildings and structures in Okmulgee County, Oklahoma